Uncle Sam is a superhero appearing in American comic books published by DC Comics. Based on the national personification of the United States, Uncle Sam, the character first appeared in National Comics #1 (July 1940) and was created by Will Eisner.

Publication history

Quality Comics

Uncle Sam first appeared in National Comics #1 (July 1940), which was published by Quality Comics during the Golden Age of Comic Books. He was depicted as a mystical being who was originally the spirit of a slain patriotic soldier from the American Revolutionary War, and who now  appears in the world whenever his country needs him. The character was used for a few years from 1940 to 1944, briefly receiving its own series, Uncle Sam Quarterly. During this time, he had a young, non-costumed sidekick named Buddy Smith.

According to Jess Nevins' Encyclopedia of Golden Age Superheroes, "he fights a variety of Axis agents, human and superhuman, from the Black Legion to the shrink-ray-wielding Professor Nakajima. Uncle Sam also fights the mad scientist Dr. Dirge, the King Killer, and the insanity-causing Mad Poet".

DC Comics
DC Comics acquired the character as part of its acquisition of the Quality characters in the 1950s, and he was used as a supporting character in Justice League of America in the 1970s. This established Uncle Sam as the leader of the Freedom Fighters, a team of former Quality characters that briefly received its own title. This team was initially based on a parallel world called Earth-X, where World War II had lasted into the 1970s.

Uncle Sam's origin was rewritten somewhat in The Spectre, where Uncle Sam is described as a spiritual entity created through an occult ritual by the Founding Fathers. This "Spirit of America" was initially bound to a powerful talisman and would take physical form by merging with a dying patriot. The new origin states that the Spirit of America had taken human form as the Minute-Man during the Revolutionary War, Brother Jonathan in later conflicts and, during the American Civil War, had been split in two as Johnny Reb and Billy Yank.

The Spirit first assumed its now-familiar Uncle Sam incarnation in 1870, when it resurrected a political cartoonist who had been killed by Boss Tweed. The second host of Uncle Sam fought in World War I. A third (the character's Golden Age incarnation) was a superhero during World War II but vanished at the end of the war, erasing any subsequent appearances from the fictional history of the DC Universe (although most of them had already been erased by the Crisis on Infinite Earths). In The Spectre, the Spirit is resurrected in a new costumed form called the Patriot, but later reverts to Uncle Sam in a Superman issue.

A 1997 Vertigo series features the character with the persona of a street person. A similar notion was suggested by Alan Moore in his 1980s crossover proposal Twilight of the Superheroes; this interpretation was inspired by the satirical novel The Public Burning by Robert Coover, which also features a superheroic version of Uncle Sam.

In Infinite Crisis #1, the Freedom Fighters are attacked by the Secret Society of Super Villains. Three of the Freedom Fighters, Human Bomb, Phantom Lady, and Black Condor are killed in the battle. Uncle Sam himself seemingly dies at the hands of Sinestro. The other team members are brutally injured but survive. Uncle Sam is seen face down in rainwater.
When the dead heroes are found strung up on the Washington Monument in #2, Uncle Sam is missing.

The character's latest incarnation appeared in the first issue of Uncle Sam and the Freedom Fighters, and spends the first few issues of this new series attempting to form a new version of the Freedom Fighters. This new Uncle Sam emerges from the Mississippi River at the same time as Father Time is elsewhere planning the future of S.H.A.D.E. with new incarnations of the Freedom Fighters members. Uncle Sam, disturbed by the deadly force used by the new versions of Phantom Lady, The Human Bomb, Doll Man, and others, successfully recruits these metahumans into his new Freedom Fighters team, which results in Father Time ordering his remaining S.H.A.D.E. personnel to pursue and kill Uncle Sam and his team. Although Uncle Sam is shown to be against killing, particularly rebuking Doll Man for murdering a crime lord in front of the man's young grandson (in issue #1), Uncle Sam is not against using deadly force when necessary.

He is also seen in Final Crisis #4 and classified as Corrupted when Alan Scott is looking for remaining superhumans to fight Darkseid's forces.

Uncle Sam shows up in the Blackest Night crossover, helping many other superheroes fight the returning dead. This includes the slaughtered incarnation of the Freedom Fighters.

In The New 52 rebooted DC's continuity, a human African-American version appears in the comic series Human Bomb. One of the S.H.A.D.E leaders he calls delivers an order to capture Michael Taylor.

Powers and abilities
Uncle Sam has demonstrated various powers, including super strength, invulnerability, the ability to alter his size, enhanced speed, and some degree of clairvoyance. He is also shown to be able to transport himself and others to a pocket dimension called The Heartland; he does this to Doll Man in Uncle Sam and the Freedom Fighters #2. The Pre-Crisis version of Uncle Sam could at one point travel to parallel universes, as he did with the Freedom Fighters to travel to Earth-X from Earth-Two, but in another instance, Uncle Sam and the other Freedom Fighters require the help of a scientist's machine to travel to Earth-One. His powers are said to be in direct proportion of the belief people have in the idea of the United States as The City Upon a Hill. In Uncle Sam and the Freedom Fighters, Father Time states that tests indicate Sam is not a human, metahuman, or magical being, and the indication of what he is can be considered inconclusive.  Uncle Sam has stated that he does not have the ability to fly.

Other versions

 In 1998, DC published under its adult imprint Vertigo a two-issue prestige format comic series, Uncle Sam. It was written by Steve Darnall with painted artwork by Alex Ross. The series does not appear to be set in the standard DC Universe (though a picture of Superman can be seen when Uncle Sam discovers the shop in the middle of nowhere). Uncle Sam is  depicted as a ragged old man who is tormented by visions of historical episodes and modern aspects of the United States at its worst. Uncle Sam is forced to battle a dark doppelganger of himself based on corruption, deceit, and oppression, with the identity of the United States at stake.
 In an alternate DC timeline appearing in Superman/Batman, Superman and Batman have been raised by Cosmic King, Lightning Lord, and Saturn Queen, the three original members of the Legion of Super-Villains, and they have turned the Earth into a totalitarian state. Uncle Sam becomes Green Lantern when Wonder Woman gives him Abin Sur's ring, as Hal Jordan is dead in this reality. When Wonder Woman first encounters this Uncle Sam, he is visually very similar to the Uncle Sam from Alex Ross' miniseries; once she uses her magic lasso to reveal the truth to him, he reverts to his classic persona and costume.
 In the final issue of 52, a new multiverse is revealed, originally consisting of 52 identical realities. Among the parallel realities shown is one designated "Earth-10". As a result of Mister Mind "eating" aspects of this reality, it takes on visual aspects similar to the pre-Crisis Earth-X, including the Quality characters.

Based on comments by Grant Morrison and the fact that a Nazi version of Superman is depicted in the scene, this alternate universe is not the pre-Crisis Earth-X.
 On Earth-11, a world of reversed genders, a female version of Sam called Columbia leads the Freedom Fighters.
 New Super-Man features a character, Flying Dragon General, as an analog of Uncle Sam.

In other media

Television
 Uncle Sam appears in the Batman: The Brave and the Bold episode "Cry Freedom Fighters!", voiced by Peter Renaday. This version draws power from patriotic spirit (lack of it will make him vanish, leaving only his hat and enough of it will revive him). He displays the powers of super strength, force field projection (they resemble the original shield of Captain America), and the ability to grant patriotic power to others (giving them a more patriotic costume). He and the other Freedom Fighters travel in a ship called the Rockets' Red Glare capable of spaceflight. They worked with Batman and Plastic Man to fight the forces of the Supreme Chairman of Qward. Following the Supreme Chairman of Qward's defeat, Uncle Sam hooks Plastic Man up with a transmission from Barack Obama who thanks Plastic Man for his services.

Miscellaneous
Uncle Sam appears in Justice League Unlimited tie-in comic #17.

References

External links

 Uncle Sam Index
 Uncle Sam Profile
 Toonopedia page
 DC Cosmic Teams Profile: Uncle Sam

1940 comics debuts
1944 comics endings
DC Comics characters who are shapeshifters
DC Comics characters who can move at superhuman speeds
DC Comics characters who can teleport
DC Comics characters with superhuman strength
DC Comics deities
DC Comics male superheroes
DC Comics military personnel
Fictional characters who can change size
Fictional characters with dimensional travel abilities
Golden Age superheroes
Quality Comics superheroes
United States-themed superheroes
Vertigo Comics titles
Comics characters introduced in 1940
Characters created by Will Eisner